La Hija Del Jardinero ("The Gardener's Daughter") is a Mexican telenovela directed by Luis Alberto Lamata. It aired from August 18, 2003 until April 23, 2004 on TV Azteca in Mexico.

Plot
La Hija Del Jardinero was the first soap opera or telenovela that featured actress Mariana Ochoa. Ochoa played the main role, Luisa Fernanda, a talented and beautiful girl from a family that hides a secret. She fell in love with the character Carlos Eduardo, a smart doctor, who has a girlfriend named Jennifer de la Vega.

As predictable as this seems, this medium soap-opera talks about many ordinary things in life: love, exile, hate, greed and all the small things that life is about. However, the interesting plot finds a way to intertwine the characters in the most irrational and unexpected way, where Luisa Fernanda falls in love with her stepbrother Carlos Eduardo, where none of them knows the truth of their past.

Years ago, Luisa Fernanda's mother, Amelia, fell in love with Luis Alejandro Montero and got pregnant. Amelia's father, Fernando, got so mad that he never let her come back home, thinking that the gardener was the father. The fact is that the real father Luis Alejandro Montero whose first action was to unrecognize his daughter and immediately marry an older woman, Marisa Gomez Ruiz. She had a son, who fell in love years later with Amelia's daughter, Luisa Fernanda. When Montero married Marisa, the owner of the bank, he wanted to ruin her and her son Carlos Eduardo when she goes to a coma but he fails. Consuela, Amelia's sister, who hated her niece Luisa and was in love with Montero later dies in a car accident trying to reach her niece to tell her father the truth: Luisa Fernanda will be the heiress of her grandfather Fernando Alkantera too or the only one and not only or at all Consuela.

Cast

References

External links
La Hija del Jardinero at TV Azteca
La Hija del Jardinero at IMDB
Forum La Hija del Jardinero at Telenovela World

2004 telenovelas
2004 Mexican television series debuts
2005 Mexican television series endings
Mexican telenovelas
Spanish-language telenovelas
TV Azteca telenovelas